James Hill (born 14 May 1987) is an English television personality who rose to fame in 2014 by taking part in the tenth series of The Apprentice. Subsequently, he took part in the sixteenth series of Celebrity Big Brother in 2015, eventually being crowned winner with over 65% of the votes. James has since starred in a number of TV shows including ITV's Celebrity Dinner Date, E4's 5 Star Hotel, and Channel 4's Celebrity Coach Trip.

TV career 
Hill competed in the 10th season of The Apprentice, getting eliminated in ninth place. It was revealed that he had been in a relationship with fellow candidate Lauren Riley during the filming of the programme.

On 27 August 2015, Hill entered the Celebrity Big Brother house for its sixteenth series. On 24 September, Hill was announced as the winner. James has also starred in Celebrity Dinner Dates in 2017. In 2018 he starred in Five Star Hotel.

Filmography

References

External links 

1987 births
Living people
English businesspeople
People from Chesterfield, Derbyshire
Television personalities from Derbyshire
The Apprentice (British TV series) candidates
Reality show winners
Big Brother (British TV series) winners
English people convicted of assault